The  Dennis A. Murphy Trophy was presented annually to the World Hockey Association's best defenceman. 

It was named in honour of WHA co-founder Dennis Murphy.

Winners
1973 – J. C. Tremblay, Quebec Nordiques
1974 – Pat Stapleton, Chicago Cougars
1975 – J. C. Tremblay, Quebec Nordiques
1976 – Paul Shmyr, Cleveland Crusaders
1977 – Ron Plumb, Cincinnati Stingers
1978 – Lars-Erik Sjoberg, Winnipeg Jets
1979 – Rick Ley, New England Whalers

World Hockey Association trophies and awards